Trichopilia, abbreviated Trpla. in the horticultural trade, is a genus of orchids. It consists of about 45 currently recognised species (as of June 2014), native to Mexico, Central America, the West Indies and South America.

Species

Trichopilia aenigma 
Trichopilia amabilis 
Trichopilia archilarum 
Trichopilia backhousiana 
Trichopilia boliviensis 
Trichopilia brasiliensis
Trichopilia brevis
Trichopilia callichroma
Trichopilia concepcionis 
Trichopilia dalstroemii 
Trichopilia endresiana 
Trichopilia eneidae 
Trichopilia fragrans
Trichopilia freulerae 
Trichopilia galeottiana
Trichopilia gracilis
Trichopilia grata 
Trichopilia hennisiana
Trichopilia juniniensis
Trichopilia laxa
Trichopilia leucoxantha
Trichopilia maculata
Trichopilia marginata
Trichopilia mesoperuviensis 
Trichopilia mutica 
Trichopilia occidentalis 
Trichopilia oicophylax
Trichopilia olmosii 
Trichopilia peruviana
Trichopilia primulina 
Trichopilia punctata 
Trichopilia punicea 
Trichopilia × ramonensis 
Trichopilia rostrata
Trichopilia sanguinolenta 
Trichopilia santoslimae 
Trichopilia similis 
Trichopilia steinii 
Trichopilia suavis
Trichopilia subulata 
Trichopilia tortilis
Trichopilia tubella 
Trichopilia turialbae
Trichopilia undulatissima
Trichopilia wageneri

References

External links

 
Oncidiinae genera